Franc "Feri" Cifer (born 16 February 1971) is a retired Slovenian football defender.

During his career, Cifer played for NK Mura and Nafta Lendava. He made seven appearances for the Slovenia national team.

References

External links
Player profile at PrvaLiga 

Player profile at NZS 

1971 births
Living people
Slovenian footballers
Association football defenders
Slovenia international footballers
NK Mura players
NK Nafta Lendava players
ND Mura 05 managers
Slovenian PrvaLiga players
Slovenian football managers